General elections were held in Lebanon between 12 July and 9 August 1953, the first under the new electoral system which allowed candidates to win with a plurality of votes, rather than requiring a second round. Independent candidates won the majority of seats. Voter turnout was 50.0%.

Results

Electoral districts

Bourj Hammoud 
The incumbent parliamentarian Dikran Tosbath, who had won his seat in the 1951 parliamentary election as an anti-Tashnag candidate, sought re-election. He was a close associate of President Camille Chamoun. As the Tashnag Party prioritized good relations with the government they threw their support behind Tosbath. Tosbath was also supported by the National Bloc. The Hunchag-Ramgavar-Independent Group alliance opted not to contest the Bourj Hammoud seat, concentrating their efforts in the Beirut I – Medawar seat instead. Hoping to benefit from the absence of other opposition candidates in Bourj Hammoud, the Lebanese Communist Party fielded Artin Madoyan.

4,696 out of the 15,895 registered voters (29.54%) cast their ballots on July 12, 1953. The electoral participation in Bourj Hammoud was the lowest in all of the Mount Lebanon Governorate. Tosbath won the election by a wide margin, obtaining 3,929 votes (83.67%) against 709 votes (15.11%) for Madoyan.

Bint Jbeil 
The Bint Jbeil electoral district was created in 1953, as a single-member constituency. In the 1953 parliamentary election the seat was won by Ahmad al-As'ad, a powerful Shia landlord. His main opponent in the election had been the nationalist candidate Ali Bazzi.

Beirut V - Minet el Hosn 
Beirut V - Minet el Hosn covered three neighbourhoods (quartiers) of the capital Beirut; Minet El Hosn, Dar Mreisse and Port and was attributed to a single Christian Minority seat. The district elected a single parliamentarian, belonging to Minorities. The district had 13,890 registered voters. The contenders for the Beirut V seat were Joseph Chader, Edmond Rabbath, Farid Jubran, Chafic Nassif and Jemil Attié.

References

Lebanon
1953 in Lebanon
Elections in Lebanon
Election and referendum articles with incomplete results